At least three ships of the Argentine Navy have been named Bouchard:

 , a  commissioned in 1937 and transferred to Paraguay as Nanawa in 1964.
 , an  launched in 1944 as USS Borie and renamed on transfer in 1972. She was scrapped in 1984.
 , a  patrol vessel commissioned in 2012 as French L'Adroit and renamed on transfer in 2019.

Argentine Navy ship names